Tjunkaya Tapaya  (born 1947) is an Aboriginal Australian artist. She is most recognised for her batik work and is one of the best-known batik artists in Australia. Her works also include acrylic paintings, weaving, fibre sculpture, ceramics, wood carving and printmaking. Most of Tapaya's paintings depict places and events from her family's dreaming stories. Her batik work is of the classic Ernabella style, which eschews the Indonesian use of repeated block printed designs in favour of hand-drawn freehand designs or "walka". These "walka" are pure design and do not refer to, or contain reference to, dreamings or "tjukurpa".

Tapaya is a member of the Pitjantjatjara people. She was born in the desert in the far northwest of South Australia. Her mother had walked from Walytjitjata, in the Northern Territory, and arrived at Ernabella Mission shortly after Tapaya's birth. Ernabella was run by missionaries at the time, and Tjunkaya grew up there. The craft room at Ernabella Mission was established in 1948 and nurtured the artistic talents of Tapaya and other children and adults living on the mission. The craft room taught spinning and weaving originally but later added batik and painting to its activities, and later still became a professionally run Aboriginal-owned incorporated arts enterprise known as Ernabella Arts, after the mission was closed and the land returned to its traditional Pitjantjatjara owners.

Like most early artists in her community, Tjunkaya's original style came from milpatjunanyi – an ancient Western Desert practice of drawing in the sand to tell stories to children. This is the basis of the classic Ernabella "walka".

Ernabella women began to be taught batik making in 1971. In 1974, Ernabella Arts sent Tapaya to Yogyakarta with several other Pitjantjatjara women to learn more about making batik from Indonesian artists.

Tapaya's work has been shown in several exhibitions in Australia, Europe, North America, and Southeast Asia. Tapaya has work in the National Gallery of Victoria, the State Library of South Australia, the Queensland Gallery of Modern Art, the National Gallery of Australia, the National Museum of Australia, and the British Museum.

On 8 June 2020, in the 2020 Queen's Birthday Honours, Tapaya was awarded a Medal of the Order of Australia (OAM) in recognition of her service to Indigenous visual arts and the community.

References

1947 births
Living people
20th-century Australian women artists
20th-century Australian artists
20th-century ceramists
20th-century women textile artists
20th-century textile artists
21st-century Australian women artists
21st-century Australian artists
21st-century ceramists
21st-century women textile artists
21st-century textile artists
Australian painters
Australian women painters
Artists from South Australia
Pitjantjatjara people
Australian weavers
Australian printmakers
Women printmakers
Australian ceramicists
Australian women ceramicists
Australian Aboriginal artists
Recipients of the Medal of the Order of Australia